Adam Joseph Vella (born 12 June 1971) is the National Shotgun Coach of the Australian Team.  A former Australian olympic clay target shooting champion.   Vella was born in Melbourne and is a Commonwealth Games four times gold medalist and an Olympic bronze medalist.

Adam Vella is the only shooter who has ever ranked #1 in the World at the same time in Trap and Double Trap.

Despite being the No 1 ranked shooter in the world in 2007, Adam missed on the selection to the 2008 Olympics.  His international performances were not taken into consideration as per the AISL Olympic selection criteria and the position was won by Craig Henwood after beating Adam by 1 target.

Adam Vella represented Australia in 2016, his third Olympics.    https://web.archive.org/web/20160816171036/http://www.shootingaustralia.org/news/2016/shooting-australias-final-two-athletes-nominated/.

Adam Vella retired from professional Shooting and since December 2016 he has been appointed by Shooting Australia as the National High Performance Shotgun Coach.  "Adam's appointment comes after a competitive recruitment process and at an important time for the sport of shooting, as an Olympic and Commonwealth Games Medallist and former World Number One in two of the three shotgun disciplines Adam comes with an impeccable sporting pedigree. But most importantly he comes as the right person to lead our shotgun team. We need someone who knows the sport from the grass roots to the podium, someone who also has the strength of character to ensure that the sport of shooting challenges itself and delivers on its commitment to being better than it is today. Adam Vella is the unanimous choice of our selection panel" commented Shooting Australia CEO Damien Marangon.   https://web.archive.org/web/20170104164730/http://www.shootingaustralia.org/media/media-releases/2016/adam-vella-confirmed-as-national-high-performance-shotgun-coach/

Adam Vella also conducts clay target shooting events through his business Oz Shooting https://www.ozshooting.com.au

References

 https://web.archive.org/web/20160816171036/http://www.shootingaustralia.org/news/2016/shooting-australias-final-two-athletes-nominated/

External links 
 
 
 
 
 

1971 births
Australian male sport shooters
Living people
Olympic shooters of Australia
Shooters at the 2004 Summer Olympics
Olympic bronze medalists for Australia
Australian people of Maltese descent
Trap and double trap shooters
Commonwealth Games gold medallists for Australia
Olympic medalists in shooting
Shooters at the 2012 Summer Olympics
Medalists at the 2004 Summer Olympics
Shooters at the 2014 Commonwealth Games
Shooters at the 2016 Summer Olympics
Commonwealth Games medallists in shooting
21st-century Australian people
Sportspeople from Melbourne
Sportsmen from Victoria (Australia)
Medallists at the 2002 Commonwealth Games
Medallists at the 2006 Commonwealth Games
Medallists at the 2010 Commonwealth Games
Medallists at the 2014 Commonwealth Games